The  is a nuclear power plant located in the town of Shika, Ishikawa, Japan. It is owned and operated by the Hokuriku Electric Power Company.  It is on a site that is 1.6 km2 (395 acres). The plant is currently not producing electricity in the wake of the 2011 Fukushima Daiichi nuclear disaster.

Reactors on site

1999 criticality event
On June 18, 1999 during an inspection, an emergency control rod insertion was to be performed on Unit 1. One rod was to be inserted into the reactor, however, due to improper following of the procedure, instead of one rod inserting, 3 rods withdrew. For the next 15 minutes, the reactor was in a critical state (producing heat). This event was not revealed until March 15, 2007, since it was covered up in the records. Unit 1 remained shut down, pending judicial and bureaucratic evaluation.

Immediately after the event was revealed, the president of the Hokuriku Electric Power Company was called to the Ministry of Economy, Trade and Industry office and ordered to shut down the unit 1 reactor. This was not the same president as when the event happened in 1999.

In April 2007 the event had been provisionally categorized as an INES level-2 incident.

On June 5, 2007 the committee chairman of the Japan Nuclear Safety Commission inspected the control rod housing and drive mechanisms and evaluated that the event was due to cutting corners. He also concluded that the reactor operators at the time were under a lot of pressures from above, and simply punishing the operators would not be an effective deterrent for future accidents. One proposed measure was to have alarms automatically record when they go off so that records can not be altered.

A lower court had ordered the entire plant to be shut down, but that decision was later overturned by Nagoya's high court. The utility put in a request to the Ishikawa prefectural government and the town of Shika for the restart of unit 1. The unit returned to power on May 11, 2009 and resumed commercial operation on May 13.

Construction of an anti-tsunami-wall
On Wednesday 5 October 2011 a start was made with the construction of a reinforced concrete wall, that should shield the reactors against a possible tsunami. The wall was designed 4 meters high and 700 meters long, 11 meters above sea level. This was done to comply with extra governmental instructions ordered after the Fukushima Daiichi nuclear disaster. Next to this a new drainage gate was to be installed to minimize damage to plant facilities in case seawater would be able to climb over the wall and would submerge the plant. Other emergency safety measures included the installing of an extra pump to cool the reactors with seawater and an extra power source to operate a valve for venting steam out of reactors. Construction should be completed by the end of March 2013.

Possible two active faults situated under the reactors
On 16 July 2012 research done by the Japanese government revealed the strong possibility that the S-1-fault beneath the power station might be active, raising doubts about the claim made by the company in 1997 that it is inactive. It is not allowed to build a nuclear reactor above an active quake fault. If these findings would be confirmed, the Shika power station could be labeled as sitting on premises ineligible for a nuclear power plant. The fault, which runs southeast to northwest within the premises—moved sometime after 130,000 to 120,000 years ago. A review of old excavation data did suggest the strong possibility, that S-1 could have been active in a relatively recent period. Considering the presence of another fault that lies beneath the No. 2 reactor, should the two faults move at the same time, it could put the power plant into danger.

A Nuclear Regulation Authority draft report of March 2016 confirmed that the fault below unit 1 is likely to be active, and that two faults below unit 2 were possibly active.

See also 
 List of nuclear power plants in Japan

References

External links

Ishikawa Prefecture Nuclear Emergency Plans 石川県原子力安全対策室
Environment radiation monitoring 環境放射線モニタリング
Hokuriku Electric Company 北陸電力
Information Regarding the 1999 Event 志賀原子力発電所１号機 第５回定期検査期間中に発生した原子炉緊急停止について(PDF)
Noto Hanto earthquake (Japan)

1980s establishments in Japan
Buildings and structures in Ishikawa Prefecture
Nuclear power stations in Japan
Nuclear power stations using advanced boiling water reactors
Shika, Ishikawa